Mr. Music Originally is an album by Pablove Black originally released in 1979 by Studio One, the Motown of Jamaica.

Track listing
"Hurting"
"Inner Peace"
"Soul Ride"
"Dread Head"
"Shao Lin Disciple"
"Twinkle"
"Blue Dread"
"Right Side"
"Mister Muzik"

Notes
Producer – Clement "Coxsone" Dodd
Recorded at Jamaica Recording and Publishing Studio Ltd

External links
Mr. Music at Discogs
Mr. Music at Roots Archives
Pablove Black - Official Website

Pablove Black albums
1979 debut albums